Rebecca Berg may refer to:

 Jenna K. Moran (born 1972), previously Rebecca Sean Borgstrom, American role-playing game writer
 Rebecca Buckley (born 1933), American scientist